Union Sportive Municipale Saran Football is a French association football club founded in 1974. They are based in the town of Saran, Loiret and their home stadium is the Stade Jacques Mazzuca (ex Bois Joly). As of the 2022–23 season, the club plays in the National 3, the fifth tier of French football.

External links
  

Football clubs in France
Association football clubs established in 1974
1974 establishments in France
Sport in Loiret
Football clubs in Centre-Val de Loire